Mount Vernon railway station served the Mount Vernon area of Glasgow, Scotland on the Glasgow, Bothwell, Hamilton and Coatbridge Railway between Shettleston and Hamilton.

History
Mount Vernon was opened 1883 on the Glasgow, Bothwell, Hamilton and Coatbridge Railway. It was closed as a wartime economy measure between 1917 and 1919. Following nationalisation the station was renamed as Mount Vernon North to avoid confusion with the nearby Rutherglen and Coatbridge Railway station of the same name. Mount Vernon North was closed on 4 July 1955. The line closed to freight traffic on 4 October 1964.

Services

References

Notes

Sources
 
 
 

Disused railway stations in Glasgow
Former North British Railway stations
Railway stations in Great Britain opened in 1883
Railway stations in Great Britain closed in 1917
Railway stations in Great Britain opened in 1919
Railway stations in Great Britain closed in 1955